John Joseph Blayney (13 March 1925 – 17 June 2018) was an Irish rugby player, barrister and judge who served a Judge of the Supreme Court from 1992 to 1997 and a Judge of the High Court from 1973 to 1992.

John Blayney was the son of Alexander Joseph Blayney, who was a prominent Dublin surgeon at Mater Hospital.

On 12 December 1991, he was nominated as a Judge of the Supreme Court of Ireland by Taoiseach Charles Haughey. On 9 January 1992, he was appointed to the position by President Mary Robinson. Upon retirement from a long legal career, his position on the bench was filled by Justice Henry Denis Barron. During his retirement, he acted as chairman to the Blayney Inquiry into the "professional and business conduct" of a number of major Irish accountants and accounting firms.

Blayney has, on several occasions, sat on the bench for the European Court of Human Rights.

Blayney played rugby union for Ireland, earning one cap in 1950 after running a 40-yard try against the Scottish side.

References

1925 births
2018 deaths
Ireland international rugby union players
Irish barristers
Judges of the Supreme Court of Ireland
High Court judges (Ireland)
Alumni of King's Inns
People educated at Belvedere College
Rugby union players from Dublin (city)
Irish rugby union players
Rugby union centres